"Smells Like Me" is a song by American singer Charlie Puth. Released on September 2, 2022, through Atlantic Records as the fourth single from his third studio album, Charlie (2022), the song was written by Puth and American songwriter Jacob Kasher and produced by Puth.

Composition and lyrics
"Smells Like Me" is set in the key of F# major with a tempo of 108 beats per minute. It features "a bright melody, subtle guitars, and twinkling keys", and was described by Uproxx as "a mix of modern pop and an '80s synth ballad". The song sees Puth discuss a former relationship, singing that he hopes his ex-partner's "jacket smells like me".

Charts

Weekly charts

Monthly charts

References

 

 
2022 singles
2022 songs
Charlie Puth songs
Songs written by Charlie Puth
Songs written by Jacob Kasher
Song recordings produced by Charlie Puth